Bond Street is a short street in Toronto that runs from Gould Street to Queen Street East, which is home to some historic buildings and is associated with several historical figures of the city:

 Mackenzie House - 82 Bond Street home to the first Mayor of Toronto William Lyon Mackenzie
 70 Bond Street was home to Canadian operations of publishing houses, including Macmillan Publishers and Doubleday Publishing and visited by many Canadian writers like Alice Munro, Morley Callaghan, Grey Owl
 Oakham House - home to architect William Thomas of St. Michael's Cathedral Basilica (Toronto), St. Lawrence Hall
 First Evangelical Church of Toronto c. 1897 - home to many German Torontonians
 105 Bond Street - former home of Macmillan, Doubleday Canada
 St. George's Greek Orthodox Church - 115 Bond Street was formerly home to Holy Blossom Temple c.1897 and linked to Toronto's oldest Jewish congregation (Toronto Hebrew Congregation c. 1849)
 Kerr Hall, Ryerson University - site of Toronto Normal School
 O'Keefe House - 137 Bond Street home of early Toronto brewer Eugene O'Keefe, founder of O'Keefe Brewery Company of Toronto Limited (later as Carling O'Keefe Breweries)
St. Michael's Cathedral Basilica and St. Michael's Choir School.

Sources

Streets in Toronto